Par Zeytun Rural District is a rural district (dehestan) in Meymand District, Firuzabad County, Fars Province, Iran. At the 2006 census, its population was 6,695, in 1,428 families.  The rural district has 20 villages.

References 

Rural Districts of Fars Province
Firuzabad County